The 2000 Asian Speed Skating Championships were held between 14 January and 15 January 2000 at Handgait Ice Rink in Ulan Bator, Mongolia.

Women championships

Day 1

Day 2

Allround Results

Men championships

Day 1

Day 2

Allround Results

References
Men's result 
Women's result 

Asian Speed Skating Championships
2000 in speed skating
International speed skating competitions hosted by Mongolia
Sport in Ulaanbaatar
Asian Speed Skating Championships
20th century in Ulaanbaatar